Crematogaster agniae is a species of ant in tribe Crematogastrini. It was described by Vladimir Karavaiev in 1935. It is found in Vietnam and is part of the Crematogaster genus.

References

agniae
Insects described in 1935